Silseong of Silla (died 417) (r. 402–417), whose name is also given as Silju or Silgeum, was the 18th ruler of the Korean kingdom of Silla.  He was the son of the general (gakgan) Kim Daeseoji, who was the younger brother of King Michu.   His title is given as Maripgan in the Samguk Yusa, and as Isageum in the Samguk Sagi.

As a child in 392, Silseong was sent to Goguryeo as a hostage.  He did not return to Silla until 401.  In the following year, the reigning King Naemul died.  Because Naemul's sons were still young, the nobles of the kingdom placed Silseong on the throne.

After being crowned in 402, Silseong established an alliance with Wa and sent Naemul's son Kim Misaheun there as a hostage.  In 412, he sent another son of Naemul, Kim Bokho, to Goguryeo as a hostage.  He tried to kill another possible heir, Kim Nulji, but ended up dying himself.

Family 
Uncle: King Michu
Father: Kim Daeseoji, the younger brother of King Michu (김대서지)
Mother: Queen Yiri, of the Seok clan (이리부인 석씨), daughter of Seok Deung-Ya (석등야)
Wife:
Queen Aryu, of the Kim clan (아류부인 김씨), daughter of King Michu
Daughter: Queen Aro, of the Kim clan (아로부인 김씨) married Nulji of Silla
Daughter: Princess Chisul, of the Kim clan (치술공주 김씨),  married Nulji of Silla

See also
Three Kingdoms of Korea
List of Korean monarchs
List of Silla people

References

Silla rulers
417 deaths
5th-century monarchs in Asia
Year of birth unknown
5th-century Korean people
4th-century Korean people